The Saudi Medical Journal is a monthly peer-reviewed medical journal. It is an open access journal, with content released under a  Creative Commons attribution-noncommercial license.

The journal publishes original research articles, review articles, Systematic Reviews, Case Reports, Brief Communication, Brief Report, Clinical Note, Clinical Image, Editorials, Book Reviews, Correspondence, and Student Corner.

Indexing and abstracting
According to the Journal Citation Reports, the journal had a 2014 impact factor of 0.588. The journal has been in the Thomson-Reuters database since 1992. The journal is indexed in the following bibliographic databases:

 Saudi Medical Journal is a member of the Committee on Publication Ethics (COPE)
 MEDLINE/Index Medicus (National Library of Medicine) available through PubMed
 PubMed Central
 Europe PMC
 EMR Index Medicus
 Excerpta Medica Database (EMBASE)
 BIOBASE

Editors
 Founding Editor: Abd El-Hameed El-Faraidi (1979-1999)
 Previous Editors-In-Chief:
 John Muir (1980-1984)
 Rasheed Al-Kuhaymi (1984-1991)
 David A. Price Evans (1983-1993)
 Basim A. Yaqub (1995-2004)
 Saleh M. Al-Deeb (1994-2009)
 Saud Al-Omani (2009-2012)
 Ali AlBarrak (2012-2015)

History 
The journal was established in 1979. In 1985 publishing was transferred from London to Riyadh, Kingdom of Saudi Arabia.

References

External links
Official Website

Open access journals